Alicja Rosolska and Abigail Spears were the defending champions, but Spears chose not to participate this year. Rosolska played alongside Yang Zhaoxuan, but lost in the first round to Alexa Guarachi and Erin Routliffe.

Desirae Krawczyk and Giuliana Olmos won the title, defeating Ellen Perez and Arina Rodionova in the final, 7–6(7–5), 7–5.

The first round, two quarterfinals and one semifinal were played on indoor hard courts after rain persisted through the first four days (and part of the fifth and sixth days) of the tournament.

Seeds

Draw

Draw

References

External Links 
Main Draw

Nottingham Open - Doubles
2019 Women's Doubles
2019 Nottingham Open